Megachile gracilis is a species of bee in the family Megachilidae. It was described by Schrottky in 1902.

References

Gracilis
Insects described in 1902